The Veitch Memorial Medal is an international prize issued annually by the Royal Horticultural Society (RHS).

Goal
The prize is awarded to "persons of any nationality who have made an outstanding contribution to the advancement and improvement of the science and practice of horticulture".

History
The prize was first planned in 1870, in memory of James Veitch of Chelsea. At first, the prize was issued by the Veitch Memorial Trust and awarded at local horticultural shows, but from 1885 the Medals were awarded at the Orchid Conference. Since 1922, the Royal Horticultural Society (RHS), having taken over the Trust, has awarded the Medal. By 2010 over 500 medals had been presented.

Winners

19th and 20th centuries 

 1883 : John Roberts (1830-1892) (Head Gardener, Charleville Castle, Co. Offaly, Ireland).
 1886 : Andy Dey 
 1887 : A. Ives (Gardener to E.C.Jukes) 
 1891 : John Heal (c. 1841 – 1925), William Watson (Assistant Curator - Royal Botanical Gardens, Kew),
 1894 : Victor Lemoine (France) (1823–1911), George Nicholson (1847–1908) 
 1896 : Charles Sprague Sargent (1841–1927) (US)
 1897 : Liberty Hyde Bailey (1858–1954) (US)
 1899 : Thomas Francis Rivers (1831–1899)
 1901 : Richard Irwin Lynch (1850–1924) Curator of the Cambridge University Botanic Garden, Thomas Meehan (1826-1901) (1826–1901) (US)
 1904 : Lucien Louis Daniel (France)
 1906 : Ernest Henry Wilson (1876–1930)
 1907 : John Gilbert Baker (1834–1920) ; Worthington George Smith (1835–1917)
 1913 : Sir Trevor Lawrence, 2nd Baronet (1831 – 1913)
 1921 : Robert Lloyd Praeger (1865-1953) (Ireland)
 1922 : William Jackson Bean (1863–1947)
 1923 : Richard Irwin Lynch (1850–1924), Curator of the Cambridge University Botanic Garden (second award)
 1924 : William Rickatson Dykes (1877-1925); John Hoog  Lilian Snelling 1879–1972)(silver medal)
 1925 : David Prain (1857–1944)
 1926 : George Herbert Engleheart (1851-1936); Matilda Smith (1854–1926) (silver medal)
 1927 : George Forrest (1873–1932)
 1928 : Gertrude Jekyll (1843-1932) 
 1929 : Alfred Barton Rendle (1865–1938)
 1930 : William Wright Smith (1875–1956)
 1931 : Otto Stapf (1857–1933)
 1932 : Leonard Cockayne (1855–1934); Sir Fredrick William Moore (1857–1950)
 1933 : Arthur Grove 
 1934 : Francis Kingdon-Ward (1885–1958)
 1935 : Sir Edward James Salisbury (1886–1978) (of Radlett)
 1936 : Robert L Harrow ; Arthur William Hill (1875–1941)
 1937 : John Hutchinson (1884–1972), George Russell (1857-1951)
 1938 : Morley Benjamin Crane (1890–1983)
 1939 : Isabella Preston (1881–1965)
 1941 : Eleanor Malby
 1945 : William Henry Judd (1888-1946) (of Arnold Arboretum) 
 1947 : Frederick Chittenden
 1948 : Collingwood Ingram (1880-1981); George Sherriff (1898-1967)
 1949 : Amos Perry
 1950 : Wilfrid Jasper Walter Blunt (1901–1987)
 1951 : John Macqueen Cowan
 1953 : William Bertram Turrill (1890–1961) (of Kew), Nellie Roberts (silver medal)
 1954 : Dorothy Renton (of Branklyn), Mary Knox-Finlay (of Keillour Castle) 
 1955 : Vita Sackville-West (1892-1962), Ralph Peer (1892-1960)
 1956 : Albert Burkwood (1890-1978)
 1957 : Charles Henry Curtis (1870-1958); Patrick Synge (1884-1967); Harold Hillier (1905–1985)
 1960 : Frederick Claude Stern (1874-1967)
 1961 : T. Johnson 
 1962 : Frank Reinelt 
 1963 : Percy Cane (1881-1976); Frederick Augustus Secrett (1886–1964); Sir Eric Humphrey Savill (1895-1980)
 1964 : Frances Perry (1907–1993), William Thomas Stearn (1911–2001) Christiaan de Wet Meiring (1900-1976 Caledon Botanical Gardens, South Africa)
 1965 : William Douglas Cook (New Zealand) (1884–1967), A. Nisbet (Silver medal)
 1966 : Graham Stuart Thomas (1909–2003), Eben Gowrie Waterhouse (1881–1977), John Scott Lennox Gilmour (of Cambridge University Botanic Garden), Leonard Broadbent (1916-2002) 
 1967 : Alex J Burnett, Elizabeth Hess (Principal of Studley College)
 1968 : John Stuart Yeates (New Zealand) (1900–1986), Maurice Mason (1912-1991)
 1969 : Sir Thomas Neame (1885–1973), Donald Wyman(1904-1993)
 1970 : Mary Pope (Flower arranger) 
 1971 : B.L.Burtt (1913-2008), Frances Perry,; Helen Richardson (Daffodil breeder); W. Bishop,; T. Durrant,; A. Westall (silver medal) 
 1972 : Xenia Field (1894–1998),; Roy Lancaster (born 1938); Mrs T. Rochford; E. Smith (silver medal) 
 1973 : Countess of Haddington 
 1974 : John Bergmans (Netherlands) (1892–1980); R. Fiske 
 1975 : J. Fraser Thomas Robert Noel Lothian (1915-2004) 
 1976 : Alice Margaret Coats (1905–1978); Margaret Stones (silver medal) 
 1977 : Iris Bannochie (1914–1988); A. Gray 
 1978 : Gavin Brown (1910-1987); Frederick Alkmund Roach (1909-2004),; B. Fry 
 1979 : Fred Whitsey (1919–2009); Gordon Rowley, J.W. Goodwin (of Pukeiti Gardens); S. Coe 
 1980 : A. Healey, F. Keenan, S. Orr (silver medal), F. Potter,; Robert John Garner 
 1981 : David Robinson (1928–2004), F. Cleary, David McClintock
 1982 : P. Teunissen 
 1983 : P.B.J. Joubert (South Africa)
 1984 :  (1921 - 2010), Mary Grierson (1912–2012), R. Beaumont
 1985 : Mavis Batey (1921–2013); K. Andrew, N. Luitse,; C. Mitchelmore,; Margaret Stones
 1986 : Ambrose Congreve (1907–2011),; R. Sagarik 
 1987 : Rachel Lambert Mellon (1910-1914); K. Beckett,; Victor Fowler; R. Mellon 
 1988 : E. Napier,; L. Pemberton; T. Wright 
 1989 : John Alfred Codrington (1898–1991) Helen Robinson (1919-2004), J. Glazebrook, E. Scholtz, Ashley Stephenson Carl Ferris Miller (1921–2002)
 1990 : Chen Hang (born c. 1931), M. Arai, Elizabeth Scholtz
 1991 : John L. Creech (1920–2009), Lawrence James Metcalf (1928 - 2017)
 1992 : Patrice Fustier (French), D. G. Hessayon (born 1928), Olive Hilliard, Joy Larkcom, J. Ravenscroft 
 1993 :  Brent Elliot, Sir Peter Smithers, Brenda Hyatt, H. Suzuki 
 1994 : David C.H. Austin, R. Birchall, A. Kenrick, Dick van Gelderen, T. Venison, Wang Dajun 
 1995 : Gilly Drummond, Mikinori Ogisu, A. Paterson, Jane Pepper (1945-), B. Self 
 1996 : Gloria D. Barretto (1916-), B. Howard, H. Noblett, C. Riley, S. Spongberg, D. Steed, Michael Upward (-2015), R. Waite 
 1997 : Ray Bilton (1937-2012); B. Briggs,; Brian Rittershausen; Kiat Tan 
 1998 : Bruce Macdonald (Missouri Botanical Garden); R. Aylett; J. Bleasdale; P. Catt; K. Cockshull; R. Elliot; E. Hetherington, M. Rix 
 1999 : Sonja Bernadotte (1944–2008); Helen Dillon (1938-); Christopher Grey-Wilson; P. Hemsley; Hugh Johnson; James H. McColl; J. Quinlan,; Brian and Maurice Woodfield 
 2000 : William Flemer,; F. Last;Anna Pavord; Daphne Vince-Prue; Jean O'Neill
 Date unknown : Alfred Daniel Hall (1864–1942)
 Date unknown : Thomas Wallace (1891–1965)
 Date unknown : Werner Rauh (1913–2000)
 Date unknown : Alan Bloom (1906-2005)
 Date unknown : Miles Hadfield (1903-1982)
 Date unknown : George Hermon Slade AM (1910-2002) (Australian orchid collector)

21st century
(See the Royal Horticultural Society Green Manual for further reference.)
 2001 : Francis Higginson Cabot (1925–2011) (US/Canadian), Brian Duncan, Silviero Sansavini (Italy), P. Thoday
 2002 : Piet Oudolf (born 1944) (Dutch), Stella Ross-Craig (1906–2006), B. Machin, John Massey, G. Ogden, Martin Rickard, Lady Emma Tennant, R. Williams
 2003 :  Martin John Bukovac, Richard Bisgrove, J. Dowle, J. Moorby, Peter Raven (USA), Shirley Sherwood, Vicompte Philippe de Spoelberch (Belgian)
 2005 :
 Anne-Marie Evans (A leading figure in botanical illustration, her worldwide influence has led a resurgence of interest in and greater understanding of the depiction of plants)
 W.H. Frederick, M. Solomon, Sir Richard Storey (1937-), Timothy Whiteley
 2006 : Phillip Cribb, Otto Eisenhut, Aljos Farjon, A. Langton, Norman Looney
2007 : Rex Dibley, Daniel John Hinkley (born 1953), Lord Charles Howick 
2008
Dr James B. Beard for his lifelong contribution to the development and application of scientific principles to turfgrass culture. Dr Beard founded the International Sports Turf Institute and has served the international horticultural community for the past 50 years through research, teaching and leadership.
John Nelson for his outstanding practical work over many years in the restoration of the Lost Gardens of Heligan, one of Cornwall's best-known tourist attractions.
2009
David Wheeler (founder and editor of Hortus: A Gardening Journal)
Dr Joan Morgan (writer and historian)
Jozef van Assche (Secretary ISHS)
2010 :  Stefan Buczacki, Bob Brown, Arabella Lennox-Boyd, Haruhiko Nagata, Jennifer Owen
2011 : Graham Ross (Australia), Christopher Bailes (U.K.), Rosemary Alexander (U.K.), Keshab Pradhan (Sikkim, India)
2012 :  Susyn Andrews (U.K.), John Elliott (Singapore), Chris Lane (U.K.), Hugh McAllister (U.K.), Beverley McConnell
 2013
 Peter Del Tredici, Peter Furniss, Sue Minter, Alec Pridgeon and Margaret Owen
Dr Keith Hammett, New Zealander whose horticultural interests include Sweet Peas, Dahlias and Clivias
 2014 : Mark Chase, Martin Gardner, Antonio de Almeida Monteiro, Philip Baulk and Gianfranco Giustina (Italy)
 2015 : Gillian Barlow, Robert Berry, Neil Bragg, Fergus Garrett, Charles Nelson, Penny Snell and John Pilbeam 
 2016 : Sarah Carey, Diana Grenfell, Ernst van Jaarsveld (of Kirstenbosch National Botanical Garden), Marco Polo Stufano and Dr Ken Thompson.
 2017 : Dominic Cole, Rod Leeds, Philippe Lecoufle, William McNamara and Andrew McIndoe 
 2018 : Prof Rosemary Collier, Gerald Edwards, Michael Hudson and Dr Douglas Needham.
 2019 : Ursula Drioli, Fabio Garbari, John Tan Jiew Hoe and Rachel Lever 
 2020 : John Anderson, Owen Johnson, Rosie Peddle, Derek Spicer and Ian Young
 2021 : Junonia Colley, John Hughes, Phil Lusby and Long Yayi
 2022 : James Alexander-Sinclair, Dr Matthew Jebb, Harri Lorenzi, Paul Meyer and Thomas Pakenham

See also

 List of agriculture awards

References

External links
 Royal Horticultural Society (RHS) Awards Nominations

Royal Horticultural Society
Gardening in the United Kingdom
British science and technology awards
Veitch Nurseries